Cabestana tabulata, common name the shouldered triton, is a species of predatory sea snail, a marine gastropod mollusk in the family Cymatiidae.

Description
The shell size varies between 35 mm and 130 mm

Distribution
This species occurs in the seas along Southern Australia and Northern New Zealand

References

External links
 

Cymatiidae
Gastropods described in 1843